is a railway station in the city of Ishinomaki, Miyagi Prefecture, Japan, operated by East Japan Railway Company (JR East).

Lines
Mangokuura Station is served by the Ishinomaki Line, and is located 37.0 kilometers from the terminus of the line at Kogota Station.

Station layout
The station has one side platform, serving a single bi-directional track. The station is unattended.

History
Mangokuura Station opened on August 26, 1989. Operations of the line and the station were suspended by the 2011 Tōhoku earthquake and tsunami of March 11, 2011. Services were resumed on March 16, 2013; but remained suspended on the portion from Urashuku to Onagawa until August 6, 2016.

Adjacent stations 
 JR East
 Ishinomaki Line・Senseki-Tohoku Line
 Rapid・Local
  - Sta.Mangokuura -

Surrounding area

Mangokuura Port

See also
 List of railway stations in Japan

External links

  

Railway stations in Miyagi Prefecture
Ishinomaki Line
Railway stations in Japan opened in 1989
Ishinomaki
Stations of East Japan Railway Company